Barry Mulcair (born 1 October 1948) is a former Australian rules footballer who played for the Carlton Football Club in the Victorian Football League (VFL).

Recruited from the South Bendigo Football Club, Mulcair made his debut for Carlton in Round 13 of the 1970 VFL season against . Named on the half-back flank, he was one of their best players, but shortly after the game notified club officials of his intent to return to country football. Mulcair was eventually persuaded to stay, and ended up winning the 'Best First Year Player Award'. 
He played at half back in Carlton's premiership side that year.

Footnotes

External links

Profile at Blueseum

1948 births
Australian rules footballers from Victoria (Australia)
Carlton Football Club players
Carlton Football Club Premiership players
South Bendigo Football Club players
Living people
One-time VFL/AFL Premiership players